Hayleigh Bell (born July 19, 1996) is a Canadian former pair skater who competed with Rudi Swiegers. She competed at two World Junior Championships with former partner Alistair Sylvester.

Personal life
Hayleigh Bell was born July 19, 1996 in Burlington, Ontario. As of 2015, she is a part-time assistant at a grocery store's cooking school.

Skating career

Partnership with Sylvester
Bell and Alistair Sylvester teamed up around 2009 and were coached by Lee Barkell at the Allandale Recreation Centre in Barrie, Ontario. After winning the novice title at the 2012 Canadian Championships, the pair was named in Canada's team to the 2012 World Junior Championships in Minsk, Belarus. They placed 12th in the short program, 9th in the free skate, and 12th overall.

The following season, Bell/Sylvester received their first ISU Junior Grand Prix assignments; they placed 7th in Austria and 6th in Croatia. Having won the junior title at the 2013 Canadian Championships, they were sent to Milan, Italy to compete at the 2013 World Junior Championships. They finished 11th after placing 14th in the short and 10th in the free.

Partnership with Swiegers
Bell teamed up with Rudi Swiegers in May 2015. They placed 5th in their international debut at the 2015 Skate Canada Autumn Classic and then 8th at a Grand Prix event, the 2015 Rostelecom Cup. On June 15, 2016, they announced their retirement on their Facebook page.

Programs

With Swiegers

With Sylvester

Competitive highlights 
GP: Grand Prix; JGP: Junior Grand Prix

Pairs with Swiegers

Pairs with Sylvester

Single skating

References

External links 

 

Canadian female pair skaters
1996 births
Living people
Sportspeople from Burlington, Ontario